Domenico Cennini (1606 – August, 1684) was a Roman Catholic prelate who served as Bishop of Gravina di Puglia (1645–1684).

Biography
Domenico Cennini was born in Chiusi, Italy in 1606 and ordained a priest in November 1644.
On 6 March 1645, he was appointed during the papacy of Pope Innocent X as Bishop of Gravina di Puglia. On 19 March 1645, he was consecrated bishop by Giulio Cesare Sacchetti, Cardinal-Priest of Santa Susanna, with Onorato Onorati, Bishop of Urbania e Sant'Angelo in Vado, and Papirio Silvestri, Bishop of Macerata e Tolentino, serving as co-consecrators. He served as Bishop of Gravina di Puglia until his death in August 1684.

While bishop, he was the principal co-consecrator of Salvatore Scaglione, Bishop of Castellammare di Stabia (1678).

References

External links and additional sources
 (for Chronology of Bishops) 
 (for Chronology of Bishops) 

17th-century Italian Roman Catholic bishops
Bishops appointed by Pope Innocent X
1606 births
1684 deaths
People from Chiusi